The 2001–02 Minnesota Wild season was the team's second season of operation in the National Hockey League (NHL). The Wild missed the Stanley Cup playoffs for the second straight season, finishing last in the Northwest Division.

Off-season

Regular season

Final standings

Schedule and results

|- style="text-align:center;"
|1||T||October 6, 2001||0–0 OT|| style="text-align:left;"| @ San Jose Sharks (2001–02) ||0–0–1–0 || 
|-  style="text-align:center; background:#cfc;"
|2||W||October 7, 2001||4–3 || style="text-align:left;"| @ Los Angeles Kings (2001–02) ||1–0–1–0 || 
|-  style="text-align:center; background:#cfc;"
|3||W||October 10, 2001||2–1 || style="text-align:left;"|  Boston Bruins (2001–02) ||2–0–1–0 || 
|-  style="text-align:center; background:#cfc;"
|4||W||October 12, 2001||6–4 || style="text-align:left;"|  Chicago Blackhawks (2001–02) ||3–0–1–0 || 
|- style="text-align:center;"
|5||T||October 14, 2001||3–3 OT|| style="text-align:left;"|  Edmonton Oilers (2001–02) ||3–0–2–0 || 
|- style="text-align:center;"
|6||T||October 16, 2001||3–3 OT|| style="text-align:left;"|  San Jose Sharks (2001–02) ||3–0–3–0 || 
|-  style="text-align:center; background:#FF6F6F;"
|7||OTL||October 19, 2001||2–3 OT|| style="text-align:left;"|  St. Louis Blues (2001–02) ||3–0–3–1 || 
|-  style="text-align:center; background:#fbb;"
|8||L||October 24, 2001||3–7 || style="text-align:left;"|  Carolina Hurricanes (2001–02) ||3–1–3–1 || 
|-  style="text-align:center; background:#fbb;"
|9||L||October 27, 2001||2–4 || style="text-align:left;"| @ Calgary Flames (2001–02) ||3–2–3–1 || 
|-  style="text-align:center; background:#cfc;"
|10||W||October 30, 2001||4–2 || style="text-align:left;"| @ Nashville Predators (2001–02) ||4–2–3–1 || 
|-  style="text-align:center; background:#fbb;"
|11||L||October 31, 2001||4–6 || style="text-align:left;"|  Nashville Predators (2001–02) ||4–3–3–1 || 
|-

|-  style="text-align:center; background:#cfc;"
|12||W||November 2, 2001||4–2 || style="text-align:left;"|  Colorado Avalanche (2001–02) ||5–3–3–1 || 
|-  style="text-align:center; background:#fbb;"
|13||L||November 4, 2001||0–2 || style="text-align:left;"|  Edmonton Oilers (2001–02) ||5–4–3–1 || 
|-  style="text-align:center; background:#fbb;"
|14||L||November 6, 2001||1–3 || style="text-align:left;"| @ New York Rangers (2001–02) ||5–5–3–1 || 
|-  style="text-align:center; background:#cfc;"
|15||W||November 8, 2001||5–3 || style="text-align:left;"| @ Boston Bruins (2001–02) ||6–5–3–1 || 
|-  style="text-align:center; background:#fbb;"
|16||L||November 11, 2001||0–5 || style="text-align:left;"|  Vancouver Canucks (2001–02) ||6–6–3–1 || 
|-  style="text-align:center; background:#cfc;"
|17||W||November 13, 2001||4–2 || style="text-align:left;"|  Atlanta Thrashers (2001–02) ||7–6–3–1 || 
|-  style="text-align:center; background:#fbb;"
|18||L||November 14, 2001||0–1 || style="text-align:left;"| @ Colorado Avalanche (2001–02) ||7–7–3–1 || 
|-  style="text-align:center; background:#fbb;"
|19||L||November 16, 2001||3–8 || style="text-align:left;"| @ Detroit Red Wings (2001–02) ||7–8–3–1 || 
|- style="text-align:center;"
|20||T||November 18, 2001||2–2 OT|| style="text-align:left;"|  Los Angeles Kings (2001–02) ||7–8–4–1 || 
|-  style="text-align:center; background:#FF6F6F;"
|21||OTL||November 20, 2001||1–2 OT|| style="text-align:left;"| @ Phoenix Coyotes (2001–02) ||7–8–4–2 || 
|-  style="text-align:center; background:#cfc;"
|22||W||November 21, 2001||2–0 || style="text-align:left;"| @ San Jose Sharks (2001–02) ||8–8–4–2 || 
|-  style="text-align:center; background:#cfc;"
|23||W||November 23, 2001||5–2 || style="text-align:left;"|  Phoenix Coyotes (2001–02) ||9–8–4–2 || 
|-  style="text-align:center; background:#fbb;"
|24||L||November 25, 2001||3–4 || style="text-align:left;"|  Dallas Stars (2001–02) ||9–9–4–2 || 
|-  style="text-align:center; background:#cfc;"
|25||W||November 27, 2001||2–1 || style="text-align:left;"|  Vancouver Canucks (2001–02) ||10–9–4–2 || 
|-  style="text-align:center; background:#cfc;"
|26||W||November 29, 2001||6–0 || style="text-align:left;"|  Florida Panthers (2001–02) ||11–9–4–2 || 
|-

|- style="text-align:center;"
|27||T||December 2, 2001||4–4 OT|| style="text-align:left;"|  St. Louis Blues (2001–02) ||11–9–5–2 || 
|-  style="text-align:center; background:#fbb;"
|28||L||December 5, 2001||2–4 || style="text-align:left;"| @ Chicago Blackhawks (2001–02) ||11–10–5–2 || 
|-  style="text-align:center; background:#fbb;"
|29||L||December 8, 2001||1–5 || style="text-align:left;"| @ Philadelphia Flyers (2001–02) ||11–11–5–2 || 
|-  style="text-align:center; background:#fbb;"
|30||L||December 10, 2001||0–4 || style="text-align:left;"| @ Montreal Canadiens (2001–02) ||11–12–5–2 || 
|-  style="text-align:center; background:#cfc;"
|31||W||December 14, 2001||5–2 || style="text-align:left;"| @ Pittsburgh Penguins (2001–02) ||12–12–5–2 || 
|-  style="text-align:center; background:#FF6F6F;"
|32||OTL||December 16, 2001||2–3 OT|| style="text-align:left;"|  Colorado Avalanche (2001–02) ||12–12–5–3 || 
|-  style="text-align:center; background:#fbb;"
|33||L||December 18, 2001||1–5 || style="text-align:left;"|  Mighty Ducks of Anaheim (2001–02) ||12–13–5–3 || 
|-  style="text-align:center; background:#cfc;"
|34||W||December 22, 2001||2–1 || style="text-align:left;"| @ Vancouver Canucks (2001–02) ||13–13–5–3 || 
|-  style="text-align:center; background:#fbb;"
|35||L||December 23, 2001||3–6 || style="text-align:left;"| @ Colorado Avalanche (2001–02) ||13–14–5–3 || 
|- style="text-align:center;"
|36||T||December 26, 2001||3–3 OT|| style="text-align:left;"|  Detroit Red Wings (2001–02) ||13–14–6–3 || 
|-  style="text-align:center; background:#fbb;"
|37||L||December 28, 2001||2–3 || style="text-align:left;"| @ Edmonton Oilers (2001–02) ||13–15–6–3 || 
|-  style="text-align:center; background:#fbb;"
|38||L||December 29, 2001||3–4 || style="text-align:left;"| @ Calgary Flames (2001–02) ||13–16–6–3 || 
|-  style="text-align:center; background:#fbb;"
|39||L||December 31, 2001||2–4 || style="text-align:left;"| @ Detroit Red Wings (2001–02) ||13–17–6–3 || 
|-

|-  style="text-align:center; background:#cfc;"
|40||W||January 2, 2002||2–0 || style="text-align:left;"|  Tampa Bay Lightning (2001–02) ||14–17–6–3 || 
|-  style="text-align:center; background:#cfc;"
|41||W||January 4, 2002||2–1 || style="text-align:left;"|  Nashville Predators (2001–02) ||15–17–6–3 || 
|-  style="text-align:center; background:#fbb;"
|42||L||January 6, 2002||1–4 || style="text-align:left;"|  Buffalo Sabres (2001–02) ||15–18–6–3 || 
|-  style="text-align:center; background:#cfc;"
|43||W||January 8, 2002||4–2 || style="text-align:left;"|  Montreal Canadiens (2001–02) ||16–18–6–3 || 
|- style="text-align:center;"
|44||T||January 10, 2002||2–2 OT|| style="text-align:left;"| @ Nashville Predators (2001–02) ||16–18–7–3 || 
|- style="text-align:center;"
|45||T||January 11, 2002||2–2 OT|| style="text-align:left;"|  Mighty Ducks of Anaheim (2001–02) ||16–18–8–3 || 
|-  style="text-align:center; background:#fbb;"
|46||L||January 13, 2002||1–3 || style="text-align:left;"|  Dallas Stars (2001–02) ||16–19–8–3 || 
|-  style="text-align:center; background:#fbb;"
|47||L||January 15, 2002||0–2 || style="text-align:left;"| @ Carolina Hurricanes (2001–02) ||16–20–8–3 || 
|-  style="text-align:center; background:#cfc;"
|48||W||January 18, 2002||3–1 || style="text-align:left;"| @ Columbus Blue Jackets (2001–02) ||17–20–8–3 || 
|-  style="text-align:center; background:#fbb;"
|49||L||January 19, 2002||1–4 || style="text-align:left;"| @ Ottawa Senators (2001–02) ||17–21–8–3 || 
|-  style="text-align:center; background:#FF6F6F;"
|50||OTL||January 23, 2002||2–3 OT|| style="text-align:left;"| @ Mighty Ducks of Anaheim (2001–02) ||17–21–8–4 || 
|-  style="text-align:center; background:#fbb;"
|51||L||January 24, 2002||1–4 || style="text-align:left;"| @ Los Angeles Kings (2001–02) ||17–22–8–4 || 
|- style="text-align:center;"
|52||T||January 26, 2002||2–2 OT|| style="text-align:left;"|  New Jersey Devils (2001–02) ||17–22–9–4 || 
|-  style="text-align:center; background:#FF6F6F;"
|53||OTL||January 28, 2002||2–3 OT|| style="text-align:left;"|  Calgary Flames (2001–02) ||17–22–9–5 || 
|-  style="text-align:center; background:#fbb;"
|54||L||January 30, 2002||0–2 || style="text-align:left;"|  Los Angeles Kings (2001–02) ||17–23–9–5 || 
|-

|-  style="text-align:center; background:#fbb;"
|55||L||February 5, 2002||1–3 || style="text-align:left;"| @ Toronto Maple Leafs (2001–02) ||17–24–9–5 || 
|-  style="text-align:center; background:#fbb;"
|56||L||February 6, 2002||1–2 || style="text-align:left;"| @ Washington Capitals (2001–02) ||17–25–9–5 || 
|-  style="text-align:center; background:#fbb;"
|57||L||February 8, 2002||0–6 || style="text-align:left;"|  Colorado Avalanche (2001–02) ||17–26–9–5 || 
|-  style="text-align:center; background:#cfc;"
|58||W||February 10, 2002||4–3 || style="text-align:left;"|  New York Islanders (2001–02) ||18–26–9–5 || 
|- style="text-align:center;"
|59||T||February 12, 2002||3–3 OT|| style="text-align:left;"| @ Columbus Blue Jackets (2001–02) ||18–26–10–5 || 
|-  style="text-align:center; background:#fbb;"
|60||L||February 13, 2002||0–2 || style="text-align:left;"|  Detroit Red Wings (2001–02) ||18–27–10–5 || 
|-  style="text-align:center; background:#cfc;"
|61||W||February 27, 2002||5–3 || style="text-align:left;"| @ Mighty Ducks of Anaheim (2001–02) ||19–27–10–5 || 
|-

|-  style="text-align:center; background:#fbb;"
|62||L||March 2, 2002||3–6 || style="text-align:left;"| @ Vancouver Canucks (2001–02) ||19–28–10–5 || 
|-  style="text-align:center; background:#FF6F6F;"
|63||OTL||March 5, 2002||2–3 OT|| style="text-align:left;"|  New York Rangers (2001–02) ||19–28–10–6 || 
|-  style="text-align:center; background:#cfc;"
|64||W||March 7, 2002||3–0 || style="text-align:left;"| @ St. Louis Blues (2001–02) ||20–28–10–6 || 
|-  style="text-align:center; background:#cfc;"
|65||W||March 8, 2002||5–3 || style="text-align:left;"| @ Dallas Stars (2001–02) ||21–28–10–6 || 
|-  style="text-align:center; background:#cfc;"
|66||W||March 10, 2002||5–0 || style="text-align:left;"|  Columbus Blue Jackets (2001–02) ||22–28–10–6 || 
|-  style="text-align:center; background:#FF6F6F;"
|67||OTL||March 12, 2002||3–4 OT|| style="text-align:left;"|  Ottawa Senators (2001–02) ||22–28–10–7 || 
|- style="text-align:center;"
|68||T||March 17, 2002||2–2 OT|| style="text-align:left;"|  Phoenix Coyotes (2001–02) ||22–28–11–7 || 
|-  style="text-align:center; background:#cfc;"
|69||W||March 18, 2002||4–2 || style="text-align:left;"|  Calgary Flames (2001–02) ||23–28–11–7 || 
|-  style="text-align:center; background:#fbb;"
|70||L||March 20, 2002||1–3 || style="text-align:left;"|  Columbus Blue Jackets (2001–02) ||23–29–11–7 || 
|-  style="text-align:center; background:#fbb;"
|71||L||March 23, 2002||1–2 || style="text-align:left;"| @ New York Islanders (2001–02) ||23–30–11–7 || 
|-  style="text-align:center; background:#cfc;"
|72||W||March 26, 2002||2–1 || style="text-align:left;"| @ St. Louis Blues (2001–02) ||24–30–11–7 || 
|-  style="text-align:center; background:#cfc;"
|73||W||March 27, 2002||4–2 || style="text-align:left;"| @ Atlanta Thrashers (2001–02) ||25–30–11–7 || 
|-  style="text-align:center; background:#fbb;"
|74||L||March 29, 2002||1–3 || style="text-align:left;"|  Chicago Blackhawks (2001–02) ||25–31–11–7 || 
|-  style="text-align:center; background:#fbb;"
|75||L||March 31, 2002||1–2 || style="text-align:left;"| @ Chicago Blackhawks (2001–02) ||25–32–11–7 || 
|-

|-  style="text-align:center; background:#FF6F6F;"
|76||OTL||April 2, 2002||1–2 OT|| style="text-align:left;"| @ Edmonton Oilers (2001–02) ||25–32–11–8 || 
|-  style="text-align:center; background:#fbb;"
|77||L||April 4, 2002||3–4 || style="text-align:left;"| @ Calgary Flames (2001–02) ||25–33–11–8 || 
|-  style="text-align:center; background:#FF6F6F;"
|78||OTL||April 5, 2002||4–5 OT|| style="text-align:left;"| @ Vancouver Canucks (2001–02) ||25–33–11–9 || 
|-  style="text-align:center; background:#cfc;"
|79||W||April 8, 2002||3–1 || style="text-align:left;"|  San Jose Sharks (2001–02) ||26–33–11–9 || 
|- style="text-align:center;"
|80||T||April 10, 2002||4–4 OT|| style="text-align:left;"| @ Dallas Stars (2001–02) ||26–33–12–9 || 
|-  style="text-align:center; background:#fbb;"
|81||L||April 12, 2002||1–7 || style="text-align:left;"| @ Phoenix Coyotes (2001–02) ||26–34–12–9 || 
|-  style="text-align:center; background:#fbb;"
|82||L||April 14, 2002||2–4 || style="text-align:left;"|  Edmonton Oilers (2001–02) ||26–35–12–9 || 
|-

|-
| Legend:

Player statistics

Scoring
 Position abbreviations: C = Center; D = Defense; G = Goaltender; LW = Left Wing; RW = Right Wing
  = Joined team via a transaction (e.g., trade, waivers, signing) during the season. Stats reflect time with the Wild only.
  = Left team via a transaction (e.g., trade, waivers, release) during the season. Stats reflect time with the Wild only.

Goaltending

Awards and records

Transactions
The Wild were involved in the following transactions from June 10, 2001, the day after the deciding game of the 2001 Stanley Cup Finals, through June 13, 2002, the day of the deciding game of the 2002 Stanley Cup Finals.

Trades

Players acquired

Players lost

Signings

Draft picks
Minnesota's draft picks at the 2001 NHL Entry Draft held at the National Car Rental Center in Sunrise, Florida.

See also
2001–02 NHL season

Notes

References

Minn
Minn
Minnesota Wild seasons